Ax-les-Thermes station (French: Gare d'Ax-les-Thermes) is a railway station in Ax-les-Thermes, Occitanie, France. The station is on the Portet-Saint-Simon–Puigcerdà railway. The station is served by TER (local) and Intercités de Nuit (night trains) services operated by the SNCF.

Train services
The following services currently call at Ax-les-Thermes:
night service (Intercités de nuit) Paris–Pamiers–Latour-de-Carol
local service (TER Occitanie) Toulouse–Foix–Latour-de-Carol-Enveitg

Bus services

Bus services depart from Ax-les-Thermes towards Luzenac, Les Cabannes (Town Centre), Ussat-les-Bains, Tarascon-sur-Ariège, Mercus-Garrabet, Saint-Paul-de-Jarrat, Montgaillard, Foix, Saint-Jean-de-Verges, Varilhes and Pamiers.

Gallery

References

Railway stations in Ariège (department)
Railway stations in France opened in 1888